Master Chander was a singer, musical director and poet who sung hundreds of Sindhi language songs.

He was first to sing Kalams and songs related to love in Sindhi Language. Master Chander was born in Tharushah on 7 December 1907. His Son Mahesh Chandar is also a good classical singer. He died on 3 November 1984

References

External links
 Official website

Sindhi-language singers
Sindhi people
1907 births
Year of death missing